Gene Johnson (born August 30, 1969) is a former American football quarterback who played one season with the Arizona Rattlers of the Arena Football League. He played college football at Louisiana Tech University and attended River Oaks High School in Monroe, Louisiana. He has also been a high school and college coach after his playing career.

References

External links
 Just Sports Stats
 College Stats

Living people
1969 births
American football quarterbacks
Louisiana Tech Bulldogs football players
Arizona Rattlers players
Arizona Wildcats football coaches
High school football coaches in Texas
Sportspeople from Monroe, Louisiana
Players of American football from Shreveport, Louisiana